Maartje Scheepstra (born 1 April 1980) is a Dutch field hockey player. She was born in Papua, Indonesia, and grew up in Almere. She won a silver medal at the 2004 Summer Olympics in Athens.

References

External links
 

1980 births
Living people
Dutch female field hockey players
Olympic field hockey players of the Netherlands
Field hockey players at the 2004 Summer Olympics
Olympic silver medalists for the Netherlands
Olympic medalists in field hockey
People from Papua (province)
Sportspeople from Almere
Medalists at the 2004 Summer Olympics
Amsterdamsche Hockey & Bandy Club players
20th-century Dutch women
21st-century Dutch women